Geoff Appleford (born 26 September 1977 in Dundee, South Africa) is a retired rugby union footballer who played for London Irish at centre, then ended his career with Northampton Saints, although because of injury he never played a competitive game for the club. Geoff also played for England. He was educated at Maritzburg College.

A former Natal Shark and Mpumalanga Puma, Appleford joined London Irish in 2000. He made his England Sevens debut in 2001 and won his full England cap in 2002; qualifying through his grandparents. He was a member of London Irish’s Powergen Cup winning team of 2002, starting in the final and scoring two tries.

In the summer of 2005 Appleford joined Northampton Saints.

In January 2007 Appleford was forced to take early retirement after failing to recover fully from a shoulder injury.

Also, Appleford is possibly the only player to be signed whilst injured and retire having not played a game for them.

References

External links
 Appleford's injury forces early retirement
 Northampton profile
 Guinness Premiership profile

England international rugby union players
English rugby union players
Rugby union centres
Northampton Saints players
London Irish players
1977 births
Living people
Alumni of Maritzburg College
Rugby union players from KwaZulu-Natal